Crackerjack 2 (titled Hostage Train in the United States) is a 1997 action film starring Judge Reinhold and sequel to Crackerjack.

Plot
A policeman working alone must rescue his girlfriend and a trainload of other hostages from vicious criminals in a mountain tunnel hideout.

Cast
 Judge Reinhold - Jack Wild
 Carol Alt - Dana Townsend 
 Michael Sarrazin - Smith

Production
Filming began in April 1996 and was completed in June. The film was then shown at American Film Market (AFM) in Santa Monica, California February 27 - March 6, 1997. The film was then released in United States on video on November 11, 1997.

External links

References

1997 films
1990s action films
1990s heist films
American heist films
Canadian heist films
English-language Canadian films
Films about hostage takings
American action films
Canadian action films
1990s English-language films
1990s American films
1990s Canadian films